Steffen Karl (born 3 February 1970) is a German former professional footballer who played as a defensive midfielder.

Football career
Born in Hohenmölsen, Saxony-Anhalt, Karl started his professional career in East Germany, representing Hallescher FC and modest BSG Stahl Hettstedt. In January 1990, he moved to the Bundesliga with Borussia Dortmund, making his competition debut on 30 March, playing eight minutes in a 2–0 home win against SV Waldhof Mannheim.

Almost always a backup at Borussia during his four half-year spell (his best output consisted in 28 games in the 1991–92 season), Karl left the club in the 1994 summer, before the club's back-to-back league conquests; following a run-in with coach Ottmar Hitzfeld, before this definitive release, he also played five months with Manchester City, on loan.

Karl played one year in Switzerland with FC Sion, before returning to his country and represent Hertha BSC and FC St. Pauli in the 2. Bundesliga. In his second season at the former, he played 30 matches en route to promotion, but never played again in the top division of his country. In the following three years, he moved abroad again, playing for Vålerenga Fotball (one year) and PFC Lokomotiv Sofia (two). He became the first German to appear in the A PFG.

In 2003, 33-year-old Karl returned to Germany, playing with former East German sides. Two years later, whilst at Chemnitzer FC – he also represented VfB Fortuna Chemnitz until his final retirement in 2008 – he became the first player to be arrested in connection with Germany's match-fixing scandal, being suspected of helping manipulate the results of a May 2004 match between Chemnitz and SC Paderborn 07. He was given a nine-month suspended prison sentence for his role in the affair, and banned for eight months by the German Football Association.

References

External links
 

1970 births
Living people
German footballers
East German footballers
Association football midfielders
Bundesliga players
2. Bundesliga players
Hallescher FC players
Borussia Dortmund players
Hertha BSC players
FC St. Pauli players
Chemnitzer FC players
Premier League players
Manchester City F.C. players
Swiss Super League players
FC Sion players
Eliteserien players
Vålerenga Fotball players
First Professional Football League (Bulgaria) players
FC Lokomotiv 1929 Sofia players
VfB Fortuna Chemnitz players
Germany under-21 international footballers
German expatriate footballers
German expatriate sportspeople in England
Expatriate footballers in England
Expatriate footballers in Norway
Expatriate footballers in Bulgaria
Sportspeople involved in betting scandals
German expatriate sportspeople in Bulgaria
German expatriate sportspeople in Norway
German expatriate sportspeople in Switzerland
People from Burgenlandkreis
People from Bezirk Halle
Footballers from Saxony-Anhalt